Comedy Minus One is an independent record label based in Princeton, New Jersey.  It was founded in 2007 by Jon Solomon. Comedy Minus One picks up where an earlier Solomon label - My Pal God Records - left off, but with a more focused remit. The label, which takes its name from the 1973 Albert Brooks record of the same name, has so far concentrated on the output of a small group of post-hardcore and noise rock bands, but has also provided a distribution outlet for some previous releases.

Artists
 Bottomless Pit
 The Crust Brothers
 Edsel
 Eleventh Dream Day
 Joel RL Phelps
 The Karl Hendricks Trio
 Obits
 Oxford Collapse
 The Rutabega
 Silkworm
 SAVAK
 Tre Orsi

Releases

See also 
 List of record labels

External links

American independent record labels
Post-hardcore record labels
Noise music record labels
Experimental music record labels
Alternative rock record labels
Record labels established in 2007
Princeton, New Jersey